The Azerbaijan Cup 2007–08 was the 16th season of the annual cup competition in Azerbaijan with the final taking place on 24 May 2008. Sixteen teams competed in this year's competition. Khazar-Lenkoran were the defending champions.

Round of 16
The first legs were played on October 24 and 31, 2007 while the second legs were played on October 31 and November 7, 2007.

|}

Notes
 Gänclärbirliyi Sumqayit was excluded from the competition.
 ABN Bärdä was excluded from the competition.

Quarterfinals
The first legs were played on March 6 and 7, 2008 while the second legs were played on March 18 and 19, 2008.

|}

Semifinals
The first legs were played on April 9, 2008. The second legs were played on April 23, 2008.

|}

Final

References

External links
 APL
 Official page 
 Soccerway

Azerbaijan Cup seasons
Azerbaijan Cup 2007-08
Azerbaijan Cup 2007-08